Pavlichenko, Paulichenka or Paŭličenka is a Ukrainian surname. Notable people with the surname include:

 Dmitri Pavlichenko (born 1966), Belarusian official, head of SOBR
 Ida Pavlichenko (born c. 1987), Azerbaijani biomedical engineer
 Lyudmila Pavlichenko (1916–1974), Soviet sniper
 Semen Pavlichenko (born 1991), Russian luger
 Suo Pavlichenko, fictional character

See also
 
 Pavlychenko

Russian-language surnames
Ukrainian-language surnames